was a Japanese kabuki performer and "dean of kabuki actors at the Kabuki-za in Tokyo".

In a long career, he played many roles; but he was best known for his oyama or onnagata roles.

Selected works
In a statistical overview derived from writings by and about Nakamura Utaemon VI, OCLC/WorldCat encompasses roughly 7 works in 7 publications in 2 languages and 20+ library holdings.

 1950 —  OCLC 033711674
 1935 — .  OCLC 44435876

See also
 Shūmei

References

Bibliography
 Leiter, Samuel L. (2006).  Historical Dictionary of Japanese Traditional Theatre. Lanham, Maryland: Scarecrow Press. ;   OCLC 238637010
 __. ( 2002).  A Kabuki Reader: History and Performance. ; ;  OCLC 182632867
 Nussbaum, Louis Frédéric and Käthe Roth. (2005). Japan Encyclopedia. Cambridge: Harvard University Press. ; OCLC 48943301
 Scott, Adolphe Clarence. (1955). The Kabuki Theatre of Japan. London: Allen & Unwin.  OCLC 622644114

Further reading
  中村歌右衛門. (1935). . Tokyo: .

External links
Waseda University, Tsubouchi Memorial Theatre Museum

People from Tokyo
Male actors from Tokyo
Kabuki actors
1865 births
1940 deaths